The Grammy Award for Best Country Album is an award presented at the Grammy Awards, a ceremony that was established in 1958 and originally called the Gramophone Awards, to recording artists for quality albums in the country music genre. Honors in several categories are presented at the ceremony annually by the National Academy of Recording Arts and Sciences of the United States to "honor artistic achievement, technical proficiency and overall excellence in the recording industry, without regard to album sales or chart position".

The award was first presented under the name of Best Country & Western Album in 1966 to Roger Miller for Dang Me/Chug-A-Lug and was discontinued the following year. In 1995 the category was revived and received its current denomination of Best Country Album. According to the category description guide for the 54th Grammy Awards, the award is presented to vocal or instrumental country albums containing at least 51% playing time of new recordings.

The Dixie Chicks are the most awarded performers in this category with four wins, followed by Chris Stapleton who has three wins. Two-time award winners include Roger Miller, Lady Antebellum, Kacey Musgraves and Miranda Lambert. Canadian singer Shania Twain is the only non-American winner in this category, to date. Trisha Yearwood holds the record for most nominations, with eight. Yearwood also holds the record for most nominations without a win. The current holder of the award is Willie Nelson, who won at the 65th Grammy Awards with his seventy-second studio album A Beautiful Time.

Recipients

 Each year is linked to the article about the Grammy Awards held that year.

Artists with multiple wins

4 wins
Dixie Chicks

3 wins
Chris Stapleton

2 wins
Lady Antebellum
Miranda Lambert
Kacey Musgraves
Roger Miller

Artists with multiple nominations

8 nominations
 Trisha Yearwood

7 nominations
 Miranda Lambert (1 with Pistol Annies)

6 nominations
 Willie Nelson

5 nominations
 George Strait

4 nominations
 Dixie Chicks
 Little Big Town
 Vince Gill
 Faith Hill
 Alan Jackson
 Tim McGraw 
 Chris Stapleton

3 nominations
 Dierks Bentley
 Zac Brown Band
 Eric Church
 Brandy Clark
 Jamey Johnson
 Lady Antebellum
 Patty Loveless
 Ashley McBryde
 Kacey Musgraves
 Taylor Swift
 Shania Twain
 Keith Urban
 Lee Ann Womack
 Dwight Yoakam

2 nominations
 Jason Aldean
 Asleep at the Wheel
 Chet Atkins
 Brothers Osborne
 Johnny Cash
 Alison Krauss
 Lyle Lovett
 Loretta Lynn
 Reba McEntire
 Roger Miller
 Maren Morris
 Brad Paisley
 Dolly Parton
 Jim Reeves
 Thomas Rhett
 Blake Shelton
 Sturgill Simpson
 Hank Williams Jr.
 Gretchen Wilson
 Ashley Monroe (1 with Pistol Annies)

See also
Grammy Award for Album of the Year

References

General
  Note: User must select the "Country" category as the genre under the search feature.
 

Specific

 
Album awards
Country Album
Grammy Awards for country music